The Brampton Excelsiors are Junior "A" box lacrosse team from Brampton, Ontario, Canada.  The Excelsiors play in the OLA Junior A Lacrosse League.

History

 2012 Season:  The Ontario Lacrosse League implements a goals for/goals against ruling.  When two teams are tied with the same number of points at the end of the season, and when those two teams have split the outcomes of their own two-game series equally (e.g. 7-4, 4-7 respectively).  Burlington outscored Brampton by 1 goal, between their two games, giving Burlington the 6th place seed in the tie-break.

 2017 Season: For the second time in recorded team history the top three point scorers in the OLA were Brampton Excelsiors. Jeff Teat, Tyson Gibson and Clarke Petterson respectfully finished the 2017 regular  season in the top three points league-wide.

 2018 Season: Doug Arthur creates controversy - suspended after berating referees in their dressing room (assessed a gross misconduct) Team members threaten officials at Minto Cup and lose best of 5 series to Coquitlam 3-1.

Season-by-season results
Note: GP = Games played, W = Wins, L = Losses, T = Ties, Pts = Points, GF = Goals for, GA = Goals against

External links
 Website 
 The Bible of Lacrosse
 Unofficial OLA Page

Ontario Lacrosse Association teams
Excelsiors